Stulpicani is a commune located in Suceava County, Bukovina, northeastern Romania. It is composed of five villages, namely: Gemenea, Negrileasa, Slătioara, Stulpicani, and Vadu Negrilesei.

Politics and local administration

Communal council 

The commune's current local council has the following political composition, according to the results of the 2020 Romanian local elections:

Gallery

References 

Communes in Suceava County
Localities in Southern Bukovina
Duchy of Bukovina